William Henry Wingfield (28 July 1857 – 10 October 1938) was an English first-class cricketer active 1881 who played for Surrey. He was born and died in Wimbledon. He played in three first-class matches as a right-handed batsman, scoring 13 runs with a highest score of 5.

References

1857 births
1938 deaths
English cricketers
Surrey cricketers